Robert French (1716–1779) was a County Galway landlord and Member of Parliament.

Robert French's family was one of The Tribes of Galway. His ancestor Patrick Béag French (died 1630) was one of the two Galwaymen who successfully petitioned James II for a town charter, awarded in 1610. Patrick's great-grandson was Patrick "Silvertongue" French, who conformed to the Established Church and was the Robert's father.

Robert French is remembered for being an improving landlord of his estates, centred on Monivea in central County Galway. He rebuilt the village into its present spacious form, taught new farming techniques to his tenants and stood for election to the Parliament of Ireland, a position impossible to aspire to had his father remained Catholic. He represented Galway County from 1753 to 1760, Carrick from 1761 to 1768 and Galway Borough from 1769 to 1776. 

He married Nicolas, sister of Viscount Gosford, and had issue. He also had seven children by his mistress, Winifred Higgins.

References

 A Galway Gentleman in the Age of Improvement: Robert French of Monivea, 1716-76, Denis A. Cronin, Irish Academic Press, August 1995, 
 Robert French of Monivea, in Galway:History and Society, 1996

1716 births
1779 deaths
Irish MPs 1727–1760
Irish MPs 1761–1768
Irish MPs 1769–1776
Members of the Parliament of Ireland (pre-1801) for County Galway constituencies
Politicians from County Galway
Members of the Parliament of Ireland (pre-1801) for County Leitrim constituencies